Garrison Church may refer to:

 All Saints Garrison Church, Lucknow, India
 Christ Church, Yokohama, Japan
 CSI Garrison Wesley Church, Secunderabad, India
 Domus Dei, or Royal Garrison Church, Portsmouth, England
 Garrison Church, Copenhagen, Denmark
 Garrison Church (Potsdam), Germany
 Garrison Church, Sydney, Australia
 Malta Stock Exchange, Valletta, Malta, which was built as the Garrison Church
 Royal Garrison Church, Aldershot, England
 St Andrew's Garrison Church, Aldershot, England
 St George's Garrison Church, Woolwich, England
 St. Michael the Archangel Church, Kaunas, Lithuania
 St. Thomas Garrison Church, Chennai, India
 Saints Peter and Paul Garrison Church (Lviv), Ukraine